Maricar Manalaysay Balagtas  (born 29 July 1983), of the Philippines, is the first Filipino delegate to win the Miss Globe International title in 2001, and represented the Philippines in the 2004 Miss Universe pageant.

A native of Plaridel, Bulacan, she graduated from Centro Escolar University with a major in communications.

Maricar first gained national attention upon competing in the Binibining Pilipinas Pageant three times (2000, 2001 and 2004). In her first attempt she was unplaced and on the second attempt she placed 2nd runner-up, hence, was sent to represent the country in the Miss Globe International in Istanbul, Turkey, in the same year and win. In 2004 she joined Binibining Pilipinas again and eventually won Binibining Pilipinas Universe title.

She was chosen to represent the country in the Miss Universe 2004 in Quito, Ecuador. She was unplaced in the finals.

See also
 Binibining Pilipinas

References

1983 births
Binibining Pilipinas winners
Living people
Miss Globe International winners
Miss Universe 2004 contestants
People from Plaridel, Bulacan